Victor D. Comras (born 1943) is an American diplomat, lawyer, and writer.

Biography 
Comras was born in 1943 in New York. He received a Bachelors of Science from Georgetown University. He acquired a Juris Doctor from the University of Florida in 1966, and he attained a Master of Laws from Harvard University in 1975.

Comras entered the foreign service in 1966. Between 1969 and 1971, he served in the Arms Control and Disarmament Agency. Later on, between 1980 and 1985, he worked in the Bureau of European Affairs before going on to serve as consul general in France. He served as Chargé d’Affaires for the United States to Macedonia from 1994 to 1996. While serving the diplomatic corps, he would specialize in counter-terrorism, money laundering, and sanctions.

After serving for 35 years, Comras retired from the U.S. State Department in 2001. He was then appointed by United Nations Secretary General Kofi Annan to serve as one of five international monitors to oversee Security Council measures implemented against al Qaeda and terrorism financing.

After retiring from diplomacy, Comras began working as a special counsel for the Eren Law Firm.

Publications 
 Self Determination and the Partition of States in International Law. 1975. Harvard Law School.
 Al Qaeda Finances and Funding to Affiliated Groups. January 2005. Naval Postgraduate School (U.S.) Center for Contemporary Conflict.
Flawed Diplomacy: The United Nations and the War on Terrorism. 2010. Potomac Books. .
 Pressure: Coercive Economic Statecraft and U.S. National Security. 2011. Center for a New American Security.

References

External links 
 Eren Law Firm Biography
ResearchGate page

1943 births
Living people
Writers from New York (state)
Georgetown University alumni
Fredric G. Levin College of Law alumni
Harvard Law School alumni
20th-century American diplomats
21st-century American diplomats
Ambassadors of the United States to North Macedonia
Experts on terrorism
United Nations experts